Lino Padrón Rivera was a Puerto Rican politician, Representative, and Senator. He was a member of the Puerto Rico House of Representatives from 1933 to 1940, when he joined the Senate of Puerto Rico. He served as senator until 1945.

Biography

Lino Padrón Rivera, was born in Fajardo, Puerto Rico but lived in most of his life in Vega Baja, Puerto Rico.

Padrón was an active member of the Socialist Party for a long time. For the Puerto Rican 1932 general elections, the Socialist Party merged with the Republican Party, and Padrón was elected to the Puerto Rico House of Representatives representing District #6.

Padrón served as Representative until February 1940. That year, Resident Commissioner Santiago Iglesias Pantín died, prompting Senator Bolívar Pagán to take his place in Washington, DC. Padrón was then asked to fill Pagán's seat for the remainder of the term. Padrón also assumed Pagán's duties as President pro tempore until 1941.

In the Puerto Rican 1940 general elections, Padrón was reelected as Senator, but he didn't remain as President pro tempore. Later during the term, Padrón assumed the presidency of his party, but was replaced later by Antonio Reyes Delgado.

Padrón was one of the members of the Constituting Assembly that created the Estado Libre Asociado in 1951–1952.

References

External links
Biografía Luis Padrón Rivera on SenadoPR

Members of the House of Representatives of Puerto Rico
Members of the Senate of Puerto Rico
People from Fajardo, Puerto Rico
People from Vega Baja, Puerto Rico
Presidents pro tempore of the Senate of Puerto Rico
1892 births
1960 deaths
20th-century American politicians